From Ashes is the first full-length album by Abysmal Dawn. It was released on April 4, 2006 in the United States.

Track listing

Personnel
 Charles Elliott - guitars, vocals
 Jaime Boulanger - guitars
 Terry Barajas - drums
 Mike Bear - bass

References

2006 albums
Abysmal Dawn albums